San Mateo District is one of thirty-two districts of the Huarochirí Province, located in the Department of Lima in Peru. It was one of eleven districts that formed the Huarochirí Province after it was created by decree on August 4, 1821, during the Protectorate of San Martín.

Geography 
The La Viuda and the Paryaqaqa or Waruchiri mountain ranges traverse the district. Some of the highest mountains of the district are listed below:

See also 
 Yuraqmayu

References